Abraham Cabrera Scapin (born 20 February 1991) is a Bolivian footballer who plays as a left back for Nacional Potosí.

International career
Cabrera made his debut for Bolivia in an August 2013 friendly match against Venezuela and has, as of 1 June 2016, earned 3 caps, scoring no goals. He represented his country in 2 FIFA World Cup qualification matches.

References

External links

1991 births
Living people
Sportspeople from Santa Cruz de la Sierra
Association football fullbacks
Bolivian footballers
Bolivia international footballers
Club Bolívar players
La Paz F.C. players
The Strongest players
Guabirá players
Universitario de Sucre footballers
Oriente Petrolero players
Club Real Potosí players
Nacional Potosí players